My Family & Other Turkeys with Nigel Marven is one-hour nature documentary premiered 22 December 2013 on Channel 5. It is presented by Nigel Marven, who watches his own flock of wild turkeys kept in his house. The film also shows wild turkeys in the wild of United States and ocellated turkeys in Guatemala.

The show is made by Image Impact in association with Reel FX, who previously created Hollywood movie Free Birds. At the end of the program, Nigel and turkeys are watching this movie.

Links 
 Channel 5 website

Documentary films about nature
Films about birds